Rafael Núñez may refer to:
Rafael Núñez (politician), president of Colombia in the 1880s and 1890s
Rafael E. Núñez, cognitive scientist
Rafael Núñez (footballer), Dominican footballer

See also
Rafael Núñez International Airport, an airport in Cartagena, Colombia